William Gurdon may refer to:

 William Gurdon (cricketer) (1804–1884), English cricketer
 William Brampton Gurdon (1840–1911), British civil servant and politician